Martin Hojak (born 16 November 1997) is a Slovenian judoka.

He is the bronze medallist of the 2020 Judo Grand Prix Tel Aviv in the -73 kg category.

He competed in the men's 73 kg event at the 2022 Mediterranean Games held in Oran, Algeria.

References

External links
 

1997 births
Living people
Slovenian male judoka
Competitors at the 2018 Mediterranean Games
Competitors at the 2022 Mediterranean Games
European Games competitors for Slovenia
Judoka at the 2019 European Games
Mediterranean Games competitors for Slovenia
21st-century Slovenian people